Kevin Robert Burns (born 19 September 1955) is a British former swimmer. He competed in two events at the 1976 Summer Olympics, becoming the first black swimmer to represent Great Britain at the Olympic Games.

He represented England and won a bronze medal in the 4 x 100 metres freestyle relay, at the 1978 Commonwealth Games in Edmonton, Alberta, Canada. He won the 1976 ASA National Championship 100 metres freestyle title.

References

External links
 

1955 births
Living people
British male swimmers
Olympic swimmers of Great Britain
Swimmers at the 1976 Summer Olympics
Place of birth missing (living people)
Commonwealth Games medallists in swimming
Commonwealth Games bronze medallists for England
Swimmers at the 1978 Commonwealth Games
Medallists at the 1978 Commonwealth Games